The 2012 Dutch Basketball Supercup was the 2nd edition of the Dutch Basketball Supercup. The game was played between EiffelTowers Den Bosch, the winner of the 2011–12 Dutch Basketball League, and ZZ Leiden, the winner of the 2011–12 NBB Cup.

Match details

References

Dutch Basketball Supercup
Supercup